The Social Democratic Party of Bosnia–Herzegovina (Serbo-Croatian: Socijaldemokratska stranka Bosne i Hercegovine / Социјалдемократска странка Босне и Херцеговине) was a left-wing Marxist political party, active in the Austro-Hungarian Condominium of Bosnia–Herzegovina.

The party was active from 1909 until 1919 when it merged into the Socialist Workers' Party of Yugoslavia (of Communists), the predecessor of the Communist Party of Yugoslavia (KPJ). The party was led by Sreten Jakšić.

Footnotes

References

1909 establishments in Austria-Hungary
Political parties established in 1909
Political parties in Austria-Hungary
Social democratic parties in Bosnia and Herzegovina